Mercy Hospital or Mercy Medical Center could refer to the following hospitals in:

Australia
 Werribee Mercy Hospital, Werribee, Victoria
 Mercy Hospital for Women, Melbourne, Heidelberg, Victoria
 Mercy Hospital, Western Australia, Mount Lawley, Western Australia
 Mersey Community Hospital, Tasmania, Australia

Guyana
 St. Joseph Mercy Hospital, Georgetown, Guyana

Ireland
 Mercy University Hospital, Cork

United States

Alabama 
Cooper Green Mercy Hospital, Birmingham

Arizona 
Mercy Gilbert Medical Center, Gilbert

California 
Mercy San Juan Medical Center, Carmichael
Mercy Medical Center Merced, Merced
Mercy General Hospital, Sacramento
Scripps Mercy Hospital, San Diego
Mercy Medical Center (Redding), a hospital in Redding, California

Florida 
Mercy Hospital (Miami)
Mercy Hospital (St. Petersburg, Florida), a historic building

Idaho 
Mercy Hospital (Nampa, Idaho), a historic building
Mercy Medical Center (Idaho), Nampa, the current facility

Illinois 
Mercy Hospital and Medical Center, Chicago

Iowa 
Mercy Medical Center (Cedar Rapids, Iowa)
Mercy Medical Center – Dubuque
Mercy Hospital (Iowa), Iowa City

Maine 
Mercy Hospital (Portland, Maine), Portland

Maryland 
Mercy Medical Center (Baltimore, Maryland), Baltimore

Massachusetts 
Mercy Medical Center (Springfield), Springfield

Minnesota 
Mercy Hospital (Minnesota), Coon Rapids

Missouri 
Children's Mercy Hospital, Kansas City
Mercy Hospital St. Louis, Creve Coeur

Nebraska 
Bergan Mercy Medical Center, Omaha

North Carolina 
Atrium Health Mercy, Charlotte

Ohio 
Mercy Hospital of Defiance, Defiance
St. Charles Mercy Hospital, Oregon
Mercy Hospital of Tiffin, Tiffin
St. Anne Mercy Hospital, Toledo, a hospital in Ohio
St. Vincent Mercy Children's Hospital, Toledo
St. Vincent Mercy Medical Center, Toledo
Mercy Hospital of Willard, Willard
Mercy Medical Center (Canton), a hospital in Ohio

Oregon 
Mercy Medical Center (Roseburg, Oregon)

Pennsylvania 
Mercy Hospital (Pittsburgh)

Wisconsin 
Mercy Medical Center (Oshkosh, Wisconsin)

Other medical uses 
 Mercy class hospital ship, a ship class of the United States Navy
 Mercy Medical Airlift, a nonprofit organization providing air transportation to distant medical treatment; see

Fictional uses 
 Mercy Hospital, a hospital in the video game Left 4 Dead
 Mercy Hospital, a hospital in the video game Left 4 Dead 2
 Mercy Hospital (慈愛醫院), a hospital in TVB series The Hippocratic Crush
 Mercy Hospital, a hospital in the video game Payday 2
 Mercy Hospital, a hospital in the video game Payday: The Heist
 Mercy Hospital, a hospital in the 1986 film Star Trek IV: The Voyage Home
 Mercy Hospital, a hospital in the supernatural TV series Ghost Whisperer

See also
 Mercy Health (disambiguation)

Trauma centers